The Xiaomen Geology Gallery is a gallery in Xiaomen Village, Xiyu Township, Penghu County, Taiwan.

History
The gallery was opened in 2001.

Architecture
The gallery is divided into eight sections, which are guide of Xiaomen Island, geomorphology of Penghu Islands, landscape model, rocks and minerals, ecology, marine ecology, culture of Xiaomen Island and showcase of specimens.

Exhibitions
The gallery exhibits information, history and geological features of Penghu Islands.

See also
 List of tourist attractions in Taiwan

References

2001 establishments in Taiwan
Art museums and galleries in Taiwan
Buildings and structures in Penghu County
Tourist attractions in Penghu County
Geology museums